Gonzalo Tellechea (born 11 July 1985) is an Argentine triathlete. At the 2012 Summer Olympics men's triathlon on Tuesday, August 7, he placed 38th.

References 

1985 births
Living people
Argentine male triathletes
Triathletes at the 2012 Summer Olympics
Triathletes at the 2016 Summer Olympics
Olympic triathletes of Argentina
Triathletes at the 2015 Pan American Games
South American Games silver medalists for Argentina
South American Games gold medalists for Argentina
South American Games bronze medalists for Argentina
South American Games medalists in triathlon
Competitors at the 2010 South American Games
Competitors at the 2014 South American Games
Pan American Games competitors for Argentina
20th-century Argentine people
21st-century Argentine people